Above The Stag Theatre is an Off West End theatre in London with a focus on producing LGBT-themed theatre. It is the only producing venue in the UK presenting a year-round programme of LGBT-interest theatre. The space comprises a 100-seat main house, a 70-seat cabaret lounge and a bar.

Above The Stag Theatre was founded in 2008 by Peter Bull. From late 2008 to early 2012 its home was above The Stag, a gay pub in Victoria, London, which has since been demolished. Following an 18-month search for a new home, the company moved to a renovated railway arch in Vauxhall, where it showed over 30 productions. In June 2018, after a major fundraising campaign, Above The Stag Theatre moved to a new premises on Albert Embankment.

On 7 August 2022, the theatre announced that it had ceased trading and permanently closed its Vauxhall venue.

See also
 LGBT culture in London

References

External links
Above The Stag Theatre website

Theatres in the London Borough of Lambeth
Pub theatres in London
Pub theatres in England